Patricia A. Evans (born 1943) was the mayor of Plano, Texas, from 2002 to 2009.  She was first elected in May 2002 and was reelected to another two-year term in May 2004. On May 13, 2006, Evans clinched a third term with 57.4 percent of the vote. Her final term lasted three years. This makes her the longest-serving mayor since Jack Harvard. Although all mayors in Texas run without party identification on the ballot, Evans is a member of the Plano Republican Women's Club and the Conner Harrinton Republican Women's Club. In addition to being mayor, Evans has previously served on the Plano City Council starting with her appointment to the Plano City Council Place 3 position in 1996.  She served as deputy mayor pro tem in 2000.  In 2004, she was selected as Plano "Citizen of the Year".

Evans graduated magna cum laude with a Bachelor of Arts degree in government and history from the University of Texas at Austin. She then received a Juris Doctor from Southern Methodist University in Dallas. Previously, she had been employed as a teacher in the Richardson Independent School District and also worked in private practice as an attorney specializing in family law, zoning, and business litigation. Currently, she limits her law practice to child advocacy and is the owner of a landscaping company.

She has been married since 1964 to Chuck Evans.

References

1943 births
Living people
Mayors of Plano, Texas
University of Texas at Austin College of Liberal Arts alumni
Texas lawyers
Texas Republicans
Women mayors of places in Texas
21st-century American women
Members of the Junior League